Interstate 129 (I-129) is an auxiliary Interstate Highway which connects South Sioux City to I-29 in Sioux City, Iowa. Opened in 1976, I-129 is a  route, running  in Nebraska. At , I-129 is the shortest highway in the state of Iowa. All of the route's length is concurrent with U.S. Route 20 (US 20) and most of its length is concurrent with US 75. I-129 is also one of only four auxiliary Interstate Highways to go into a state its parent route does not.

Route description
I-129 begins along US 20 on the western edge of South Sioux City, Nebraska, just west of exit 1, a cloverleaf interchange with US 75 and US 77. US 77 travels north through South Sioux City before ending at I-29 in Sioux City while US 75 joins I-129 and US 20.  later, I-129/US 20/US 75 intersect Dakota Avenue at a partial cloverleaf interchange. U.S. Highway 20 Business (US 20 Bus.) is designated along Dakota Avenue.

East of Dakota Avenue, I-129/US 20/US 75 travels south of South Sioux City and passes through rolling farmland. For the rest of I-129's length, the two directions of I-129/US 20/US 75 traffic are separated by a Jersey barrier instead of a grassy median. The three routes cross the Missouri River and immediately intersect I-29 at an interchange. Due to the minimum amount of space along the Missouri River banks, the I-29 interchange is a modified two-level cloverstack interchange. At I-29, US 20 and US 75 continue east around Sioux City and I-129 ends.

History
Iowa received the smallest allocation, for the southern bypass of Sioux City. The proposed highway was planned to cost $22.5 million (equivalent to $ million in ), which included $15 million (equivalent to $ million in ) for the Missouri River bridge. On the 1973 state highway map, the Iowa State Highway Commission showed the planned route on the state map for the first time. I-129 was opened on November 22, 1976.

Exit list

References

29-1
29-1
29-1
U.S. Route 20
U.S. Route 75
1
Transportation in Dakota County, Nebraska
Transportation in Woodbury County, Iowa